Italy (unlike the country Italy) is a town in Ellis County, Texas, United States. Its population was 1,926 in 2020.

The community was named after Italy by a settler who had visited the European country.

History
Italy was founded in 1879 by settlers who found the surrounding land suitable for growing cotton, corn, sweet potatoes, and wheat. The Missouri–Kansas–Texas Railroad reached Italy in 1890, with the railroad stop making the town an important market center.  The population grew steadily, from 1,061 in 1900 to 1,500 in 1925, until the Great Depression sparked a decline lasting over three decades. The town began to see economic and population growth again in the 1970s, with the population rising to nearly 2,000 residents by the year 2000.

Geography

Italy is located in southwestern Ellis County at  (32.182705, –96.884967). Interstate 35E crosses the northwest corner of the town at Exit 386; it leads north  to Waxahachie, the county seat, north  to downtown Dallas, and southwest  to its junction with I-35W near Hillsboro. U.S. Route 77 passes through the center of Italy and parallels I-35E. Texas State Highway 34 leads northeast from the center of Italy  to Ennis.

Demographics

As of the 2020 United States census, there were 1,926 people, 765 households, and 561 families residing in the town.

Notable people

 Keith Davis, former safety for the Dallas Cowboys
 Dale Evans, actress, wife of Roy Rogers
 Jack Hyles, pastor of First Baptist Church of Hammond, Indiana, 1959–2001, founder of Hyles-Anderson College
 J. B. Milam, Cherokee Nation of Oklahoma
 Art Shires, former first baseman for the Chicago White Sox

Education

The town is served by the Italy Independent School District, which includes Italy High School (Grades 7–12) and Stafford Elementary (Grades Pre-K–6), and the S.M. Dunlap Memorial Library.

In 2009, the school district was rated "academically acceptable" by the Texas Education Agency.

Climate
The climate in this area is characterized by hot, humid summers and generally mild to cool winters.  According to the Köppen Climate Classification system, Italy has a humid subtropical climate, abbreviated "Cfa" on climate maps.

Photo Gallery

References

External links

 City of Italy official website

Towns in Ellis County, Texas
Towns in Texas
Dallas–Fort Worth metroplex
Populated places established in 1879
1879 establishments in Texas